César Amín González Orantes (born 1 April 1961) is a Mexican politician affiliated with the Institutional Revolutionary Party. As of 2014 he served as Deputy of the LIX Legislature of the Mexican Congress representing Chiapas.

References

1961 births
Living people
People from Tapachula
Institutional Revolutionary Party politicians
Autonomous University of Chiapas alumni
Politicians from Chiapas
21st-century Mexican politicians
Deputies of the LIX Legislature of Mexico
Members of the Chamber of Deputies (Mexico) for Chiapas